Vijaybhai Ramniklalbhai Rupani (born 2 August 1956) is an Indian politician who served as the 16th Chief Minister of Gujarat from 2016 to 2021 for two terms. He is a member of the Gujarat Legislative Assembly, representing Rajkot West. He is a member of Bharatiya Janata Party.

Early life
Vijay Rupani was born to Mayaben and Ramniklal Rupani, in Yangon, Myanmar to a Jain Bania family. He was the seventh and youngest son of the couple. His family moved to Rajkot in 1960 due to political instability in Burma. He studied Bachelor of Arts from Dharmendrasinhji Arts College and LLB from Saurashtra University.

Career

Business career
Vijay Rupani is a partner in a trading firm Rasiklal & Sons, founded by his father. He had worked as a stock broker.

Political career

Vijay Rupani started his career as student activist associated with Akhil Bharatiya Vidyarthi Parishad (ABVP). He joined Rashtriya Swayamsevak Sangh (RSS) and subsequently joined Jan Sangh in 1971. He has been associated with Bharatiya Janta Party since its establishment. He was imprisoned for 11 months and was sent to the jails in Bhuj and Bhavnagar during the Emergency in 1976. He was a Pracharak of RSS from 1978 to 1981. He was elected as a corporator of Rajkot Municipal Corporation (RMC) in 1987 and became the chairman of drainage committee. He became the chairman of standing committee of RMC from 1988 to 1996. He was again elected to RMC in 1995. He served as the mayor of Rajkot from 1996 to 1997. He became BJP's Gujarat unit general secretary in 1998 and served as the chairman of manifesto committee during chief ministership of Keshubhai Patel. He was appointed a chairman of Gujarat Tourism in 2006. He was a member of Rajya Sabha from 2006 to 2012. He served as BJP's Gujarat unit general secretary four times and chairman of the Gujarat Municipal Finance Board in 2013 during the chief ministership of Narendra Modi.

In August 2014, when Vajubhai Vala, the incumbent speaker of Gujarat Legislative Assembly, resigned as the MLA from Rajkot West, Vijay Rupani was nominated by the BJP to contest his vacant seat. He won the bypoll on 19 October 2014 by a huge margin.

He was inducted as minister in the first cabinet expansion by Chief Minister Anandiben Patel in November 2014 and held the ministry of transport, water supply, labor and employment.

On 19 February 2016, Rupani became the state BJP president, replacing R. C. Faldu. He was the BJP state president from February 2016 to August 2016.

Chief Minister (2016–2021)

He succeeded Anandiben Patel and was sworn in as the Chief Minister of Gujarat on 7 August 2016. In the 2017 Gujarat Legislative Assembly election, he retained Rajkot West constituency defeating the Indian National Congress candidate Indranil Rajyaguru. He was unanimously elected as the leader of legislature party on 22 December 2017 and continued as the Chief Minister of Gujarat with Nitin Patel as the Deputy Chief Minister. On 11 September 2021, he resigned from the post of Chief Minister. He was succeeded by Bhupendra Patel.

Controversy
In 2011, Vijay Rupani HUF sold shares worth about  35000 ($500) in Sarang Chemicals in a single transaction which were purchased in 2009 at about  63000, worth $1000, making a loss. The SEBI, the regulator, had charged 22 entities, including Vijay Rupani relative, for "manipulative trades" by pump and dump. In November 2017, the SEBI issued ex parte order imposing a penalty of  150000 or $3000 to Vijay Rupani HUF for creating misleading appearance in the stocks. Vijay Rupani HUF pleaded that the penalty was imposed without giving opportunity to be heard. The SEBI said that the entity had failed to file reply to their show cause notice in time. Later the Securities Appellate Tribunal set aside the penalty order and asked the SEBI to issue fresh order and hear all the entities.

Personal life
Vijay Rupani is married to Anjali, who is also a member of the BJP women's wing. The couple have a son, Rushabh, who is an engineering graduate, as well as a daughter, Radhika, who is married. The couple lost their youngest son Pujit in an accident and have started the Pujit Rupani Memorial Trust for charity.

See also
 Vijay Rupani Ministry
First Vijay Rupani ministry

References

External links 
 
 Official website 
 Profile on Rajya Sabha website

Chief Ministers of Gujarat
Chief ministers from Bharatiya Janata Party
Bharatiya Janata Party politicians from Gujarat
Rajya Sabha members from Gujarat
Living people
1956 births
Indians imprisoned during the Emergency (India)
State cabinet ministers of Gujarat
Mayors of places in Gujarat
Ahmedabad municipal councillors
People from Rajkot
Gujarat MLAs 2012–2017
Rashtriya Swayamsevak Sangh members
People from Yangon
Gujarat MLAs 2017–2022
Gujarati people
21st-century Indian Jains